Avalukendru Or Manam is a 1971 Indian Tamil-language film romantic drama film produced, written and directed by Sridhar. The film stars Gemini Ganesan, Muthuraman, Bharathi and Kanchana. It revolves around two women falling in love with the same man.

Avalukendru Or Manam was simultaneously made in Hindi as Duniya Kya Jaane, with a largely different cast, though Bharathi repeated her role. It was released on 18 June 1971, and performed averagely at the box office.

Plot 

Two women — Lalitha and Meena — fall in love with Kannan.

Cast 
Male cast
Gemini Ganesan as Kannan
Muthuraman as Gopal
Sundarrajan as Parameswaran
V. S. Raghavan as Sathyamoorthy

Female cast
Bharathi as Lalitha
Kanchana as Meena
Rukmani as Rajam

Production 
Sridhar's directorial Dharti failed at the box office, and his company Chithralaya suffered losses. To compensate for the losses, Sridhar decided to do two projects in same time: Avalukendru Or Manam and Uttharavindri Ulle Vaa. Avalukendru Or Manam was simultaneously made in Hindi as Duniya Kya Jaane. While choosing established actors in Tamil, Sridhar cast newcomers in Hindi to keep the budget lower, though Bharathi appeared in both versions.

Soundtrack 
The music was composed by M. S. Viswanathan, with lyrics by Kannadasan. Ilaiyaraaja, who was Viswanathan's assistant at that time played the organ for the song "Malar Edhu".

References

External links 
 

1970s Tamil-language films
1971 films
1971 romantic drama films
Films directed by C. V. Sridhar
Films scored by M. S. Viswanathan
Indian romantic drama films